The Audacious-class aircraft carriers were a class of aircraft carriers proposed by the British government in the 1930s - 1940s and completed after the Second World War. The two ships built were heavily modified and diverged over their service lives.  They were in operation from 1951 until 1979.

History 

However, it was realised that the hangar height would not be sufficient for the new aircraft that were expected to enter service, so the design was considerably enlarged.
 
Four ships were laid down between 1942 and 1943 during World War II as part of the British naval buildup - Africa, Irresistible, Audacious and Eagle. At the end of hostilities Africa and Eagle  were cancelled. Work on the remaining two was suspended. They would be renamed and built to differing designs in the 1950s.

As the builds of Audacious (renamed Eagle) and Irresistible (renamed Ark Royal) progressed they differed so much that they effectively became the lead (and sole) ships of each of their own classes. They formed the backbone of the postwar carrier fleet, and were much modified.

Ships in class

References

Further reading 
Ireland, Bernard. The Illustrated Guide to Aircraft Carriers of the World. Hermes House, London, 2005. 
Johnstone-Bryden, Richard. Britain's Greatest Warship: HMS "Ark Royal IV". Sutton Publishing Ltd., Stroud, 2000.

External links 
 

Aircraft carrier classes
 
 Audacious class aircraft carrier
Abandoned military projects of the United Kingdom
Ship classes of the Royal Navy